Robin Hood is a 1973 American animated musical adventure comedy film produced by Walt Disney Productions and released by Buena Vista Distribution. Produced and directed by Wolfgang Reitherman, it is the 21st Disney animated feature film. Based on the English folk tale of the same name, the story follows the adventures of Robin Hood, Little John, and the inhabitants of Nottingham as they fight against the excessive taxation of Prince John, and Robin Hood wins the hand of Maid Marian. The film features the voices of Brian Bedford, Phil Harris, Peter Ustinov, Pat Buttram, Monica Evans, and Carole Shelley.

The idea to adapt Robin Hood into an animated feature was dated back to Walt Disney's interest in the tale of Reynard the Fox following the release of Snow White and the Seven Dwarfs (1937). The idea was repeatedly shelved for several decades. In 1968, Ken Anderson pitched a film adaptation of Robin Hood, incorporating ideas from Reynard of Fox by using anthropomorphic animals rather than humans. The project was approved, becoming the first animated feature to be produced without the involvement of Walt Disney.  

Robin Hood was released on November 8, 1973. The film was a commercial success but received mixed reviews.

Plot 

The story is narrated by Alan-a-Dale. He introduces Robin Hood and Little John, who live in Sherwood Forest, robbing from the rich and giving to the overtaxed townsfolk of Nottingham. The Sheriff of Nottingham tries to catch the two, but he fails every time. Meanwhile, Prince John and his counselor Sir Hiss arrive in Nottingham. Earlier, Sir Hiss hypnotized Prince John's brother King Richard to fight in the  third crusade, allowing Prince John to take the throne as de facto King. Unfortunately, the Prince is greedy and immature, even sucking his thumb whenever his mother is mentioned. Robin and Little John rob Prince John by disguising themselves as fortune tellers, prompting the Prince to put a bounty on their heads.

The Sheriff, under Prince John's orders, taxes the inhabitants of Nottingham excessively. However, Robin gives back some money to a family of rabbits, and gives a bow, arrow and one of his hats to the young rabbit Skippy for his birthday. Skippy and his two sisters and his friend, Toby, test out the bow, but Skippy accidentally fires the arrow into the grounds of Nottingham Castle. The children sneak inside, meeting Maid Marian and her lady-in-waiting Lady Kluck. Marian reveals that she and Robin were once childhood sweethearts, but she was sent to London and has not seen him for years, only recently returning to Nottingham and assuming Robin has forgotten her.

Friar Tuck, the local priest, visits Robin and Little John to report that Prince John is hosting an archery tournament, with a kiss from Maid Marian as the prize. Robin disguises himself as a stork and enters the contest, while Little John masquerades as the Duke of Chutney to get close to Prince John. Robin wins the tournament, but Prince John recognizes and exposes him, sentencing him to death despite Marian's pleas. Little John threatens Prince John with a dagger, resulting in a fight between Robin's forces and Prince John's soldiers, culminating in Robin's party escaping with Marian and Lady Kluck in tow.

In the forest, Robin and Marian share a romantic evening, then are surprised by Robin's "merry men", who sing a funny song dubbing John the "Phony King of England". Prince John learns of the song and furiously triples the taxes; most of the town cannot pay, and are imprisoned. The Sheriff visits Friar Tuck's church to steal from the poor box; Tuck throws him out and attacks him with a quarterstaff, resulting in Tuck's arrest for "treason". Prince John learns of this, and orders Tuck's execution, hoping to lure Robin into doing something rash to save him.

The night before the execution, despite the precautions of Prince John, Robin Hood and Little John sneak into the castle. Little John manages to free all of the prisoners, Tuck included, whilst Robin steals all of Prince John's gold. Hiss awakens, and tries to stop them, rousing the castle. Chaos ensues as Robin and the others try to escape to Sherwood Forest, and Robin is forced to return to the castle to rescue Skippy's sister, Tagalong. The Sheriff chases Robin through the building and attacks him with a lit torch, setting the castle ablaze and forcing Robin to jump into the moat. Little John and Skippy anxiously watch as the water is pelted with arrows, and for a moment, it seems as if Robin has been killed, but he eventually emerges unharmed. Hiss chides a despairing Prince John for his failed trap, and points out the castle (belonging to Prince John's mother) is afire, which drives Prince John to insanity.

Later, King Richard returns to England, and sentences Prince John, Hiss, and the Sheriff to hard labor in the Royal Rock Pile. He pardons Robin Hood, who marries Maid Marian and leaves Nottingham, with Little John and Skippy in tow.

Voice cast 
 Brian Bedford as Robin Hood, a gifted archer and the leader of a band of rogues. He is portrayed as a red fox.
 Monica Evans as Maid Marian, the niece of King Richard and love interest of Robin Hood. She is portrayed as a red fox.
 Phil Harris as Little John, Robin Hood's best friend. He is portrayed as a brown bear.
 Roger Miller as Alan-a-Dale, a minstrel who serves as the narrator of the film. He is portrayed as a rooster.
 Andy Devine as Friar Tuck, the priest of Nottingham. He is portrayed as a badger.
 Peter Ustinov as Prince John, the Prince Regent of England. Ustinov also voiced Prince John in the German version of the film. He is portrayed as an adolescent lion. 
Ustinov also voices King Richard, John's older brother, Maid Marian's uncle and the rightful King of England. Unlike John, Richard is depicted with a mane.
 Terry-Thomas as Sir Hiss, Prince John's advisor. Portrayed as a snake.
 Carole Shelley as Lady Kluck, the lady-in-waiting of Maid Marian. She is portrayed as a hen.
 Pat Buttram as the Sheriff of Nottingham. He is portrayed as a wolf.
 George Lindsey and Ken Curtis as Trigger and Nutsy, respectively, the Sheriff's guardsmen. They are portrayed as vultures.
 Billy Whitaker, Dana Laurita, Dori Whitaker, and Richie Sanders as Skippy, Sis, Tagalong, and Toby, respectively, local children of Nottingham who idolize Robin Hood. Skippy, Sis, and Tagalong are white rabbits while Toby is a tortoise.
 John Fiedler and Barbara Luddy as the Church of Nottingham's Sexton and his wife. They are portrayed as church mice.
Luddy also voices Mrs. Rabbit (Skippy, Sis, and Tagalong's mother).
 Candy Candido as the Captain of the Royal Guard. He is portrayed as a crocodile.
 J. Pat O'Malley as Otto the blacksmith. He is portrayed as a bloodhound.

Production 

During production on Snow White and the Seven Dwarfs in 1937, Walt Disney became interested in adapting the twelfth-century legend of Reynard the Fox. However, the project languished due to Disney's concern that Reynard was an unsuitable choice for a hero. In a meeting held on February 12, 1938, Disney commented: "I see swell possibilities in 'Reynard', but is it smart to make it? We have such a terrific kid audience ... parents and kids together. That's the trouble – too sophisticated. We'll take a nosedive doing it with animals." For Treasure Island (1950), Disney seriously considered three animated sections, each one of the Reynard tales, to be told by Long John Silver to Jim Hawkins as moral fables. Ultimately, the idea was nixed as Treasure Island became the studio's first fully live-action film. In the next decade, the studio decided to make Reynard the villain of a musical feature film based on Edmond Rostand's Chanticleer, but the production was scrapped in favor of The Sword in the Stone (1963).

In October 1968, during a fishing trip with Ken Anderson, studio executive Card Walker suggested that a "classic" tale should be the subject for the next animated film after The Aristocats (1970). Anderson proposed the tale of Robin Hood, to which Walker responded enthusiastically. Back at the studio, Anderson relayed the idea during a story meeting on The Aristocats which was met with approval. In a follow-up meeting, with Wolfgang Reitherman, Bill Anderson (no relation), and Larry Clemmons, Ken Anderson was assigned the job to begin "exploratory animal character drawings". Anderson blended his ideas of Robin Hood by incorporating that the fox character could be slick but still use his skills to protect the community. 

Additionally, Anderson wanted to set the film in the Deep South desiring to recapture the spirit of Song of the South (1946). Anderson explained, "Basically I had a wonderful time on Song of the South, and I know that all of my friends in animation did. They loved the part I played and I loved the part they played ... And so it was an attempt on my part to get the best of that sort of thing and get it going on again, bring it up-to-date." However, the executives were wary of the reputation of Song of the South, which was followed by Reitherman's decision to set the film in its traditional English location as inspired by The Story of Robin Hood and His Merrie Men (1952). Clemmons came on board the project by writing a script with dialogue that was later storyboarded by other writers.

As production went further along, Robin Allan stated in his book Walt Disney and Europe that "Ken Anderson wept when he saw how his character concepts had been processed into stereotypes for the animation on Robin Hood." According to Frank Thomas and Ollie Johnston, one such casualty was the concept of making the Sheriff of Nottingham a goat as an artistic experiment to try different animals for a villain, only to be overruled by Reitherman who wanted to keep to the villainous stereotype of a wolf instead. Additionally, Anderson wanted to include the Merry Men into the film, which was again overridden by Reitherman because he wanted a "buddy picture" reminiscent of Butch Cassidy and the Sundance Kid (1969), so Little John was the only Merry Man who remained in the film, while Friar Tuck was put as a friend of Robin's who lived in Nottingham, and Alan-a-Dale was turned into the narrator.

Because of the time spent on developing several settings, and auditioning actors to voice the title character, production fell behind schedule. In order to meet its deadline, the animators had no other choice but to recycle several dance sequences from previous Disney animated films, including Snow White and the Seven Dwarfs (1937), The Jungle Book (1967), and The Aristocats (1970) that are used in the Phony King of England scene.

Casting 
By October 1970, most of the voice actors were confirmed, with the exception of Tommy Steele cast in the title role. Steele himself was chosen because of his performance in The Happiest Millionaire (1967) while Peter Ustinov was cast because Walt Disney had enjoyed his presence on the set of Blackbeard's Ghost (1968). However, Steele was unable to make his character sound more heroic, and his replacement came down to final two candidates which were Bernard Fox and Brian Bedford. Disney executives had first seen Bedford performing onstage in Los Angeles, in which they brought him in to test for the role in May 1971 and ultimately cast him. Meanwhile, Louis Prima was so angered at not being considered for a role that he personally paid the recording expenses for the subsequent album, Let's "Hear" it For Robin Hood, which he sold to Disneyland Records.

Release 
The film premiered at the Radio City Music Hall on November 8, 1973. The film was re-released on March 26, 1982.

Home media 
The film was first released on VHS, CED, Betamax, and Laserdisc on December 3, 1984, becoming the debut installment of the Walt Disney Classics home video line. Disney had thought the idea of releasing any of its animated classics (known as the "untouchables") might threaten future theatrical reissue revenue. However, Robin Hood was viewed as the first choice since it was not held in such high esteem as some of the other titles. The VHS counterpart was re-released several times. The release went into moratorium in April 1987. 4 years after the moratorium, it was re-issued as a permanent availability title on July 12, 1991. The film was re-released on VHS six more times; on October 28, 1994, March 3, 1995, February 28, 1996, July 15, 1997, March 31, 1998 and July 13, 1999 in the Walt Disney Masterpiece Collection line.

In January 2000, Walt Disney Home Video launched the Gold Classic Collection. Six months later, Robin Hood was re-released on VHS and DVD in the line on July 4, 2000 and remained in stock until the spring of 2006. The DVD contained the film in its 1.33:1 aspect ratio, and was accompanied with special features including a trivia game and the cartoon short "Ye Olden Days". The remastered "Most Wanted Edition" DVD ("Special Edition" in the UK) was released on November 28, 2006, in a 16:9 matted transfer to represent its original theatrical screen ratio. It also featured a deleted scene/alternate ending of Prince John attempting to kill a wounded Robin Hood. On August 6, 2013, the film was released as the 40th Anniversary Edition on a Blu-ray combo pack.

Reception

Critical reaction 
Judith Crist, reviewing the film in New York magazine, said it was "nicely tongue-in-cheek without insult to the intelligence of either child or adult." She also stated that it "has class – in the fine cast that gives both voice and personality to the characters, in the bright and brisk dialogue, in its overall concept." Vincent Canby of The New York Times wrote that it "should ... be a good deal of fun for toddlers whose minds have not yet shriveled into orthodoxy" and he called the visual style "charmingly conventional". Dave Billington of The Montreal Gazette wrote "As a film, Robin Hood marks a come-back of sorts for the Disney people. Ever since the old maestro died, the cartoon features have shown distressing signs of a drop in quality, both in art work and in voice characterization. But the blending of appealing cartoon animals with perfect voices for the part makes Robin Hood an excellent evening out for the whole family." Also writing in New York magazine, Ruth Gilbert called it "a sweet, funny, slam-bang, good-hearted Walt Disney feature cartoon with a fine cast" and wrote it was "a feast for the eyes for kiddies and Disney nostalgics."

Charles Champlin of the Los Angeles Times wrote that the Disney "hallmarks are there as they ever were: the incomparably rich, full animation, the humanized animal characters perky, individual and enchanting, and the wild, inventive slapstick action." Awarding the film four stars out of five, Ian Nathan, in a retrospective review for Empire, praised the vocal performances of Peter Ustinov and Terry-Thomas acknowledging "while this is hardly the most dazzling of animated features, it has that cut-corner feel that seem to hold sway in the '70s (mainly because Disney were cutting corners), the characters spark to life, and the story remains as rock steady as ever."

Among less favorable reviews, Jay Cocks of Time gave the film a mixed verdict writing, "Even at its best, Robin Hood is only mildly diverting. There is not a single moment of the hilarity or deep, eerie fear that the Disney people used to be able to conjure up, or of the sort of visual invention that made the early features so memorable. Robin Hoods basic problem is that it is rather too pretty and good natured." Gene Siskel of the Chicago Tribune gave the film one-and-a-half stars out of four, describing the film as "80 minutes of pratfalls and nincompoop dialog," and criticizing the animation quality as "Saturday morning TV cartoon stuff." John Baxter of The Monthly Film Bulletin wrote that "for the most part the film is as bland and one-dimensional as the product of less sophisticated studios; and except for Peter Ustinov's plummy Prince John, the voice characterisations are as insipid as the animation is unoriginal."

Decades since the film's release, the film has been noted for the recycled scenes of animation. The review aggregator website Rotten Tomatoes reported that the film received  approval rating with an average rating of  based on  reviews. The website's consensus states that "One of the weaker Disney adaptations, Robin Hood is cute and colorful but lacks the majesty and excitement of the studio's earlier efforts." Metacritic gave the film a score of 57 based on 9 reviews.

Box office 
During its initial release, Robin Hood earned $9.6 million in rentals in the United States and Canada. It also grossed $18 million in foreign territories, which was at the time a Disney record, for a worldwide rental of $27.5 million.

The film has earned a lifetime gross in the United States and Canada between $32–35 million across its two releases.

Accolades

Music 

In 1969, Roger Miller began composing the songs for the film. A record of the film was made at the time of its release in 1973, which included its songs, score, narration, and dialogue. Both "Oo-De-Lally" and "Love" appear on the CD collection, Classic Disney: 60 Years of Musical Magic. "Love" is featured in the soundtrack for the 2009 film Fantastic Mr. Fox, directed by Wes Anderson. The full soundtrack of the film was released on August 4, 2017, as part of the Walt Disney Records: The Legacy Collection series on compact disc and digital.

The song "The Phony King of England" bears a strong resemblance to a much older, bawdy English folk song, "The Bastard King of England".

Songs 
Original songs performed in the film include:

Legacy 
The film has since become a fan favorite. Disney animator and director Byron Howard admitted that Robin Hood was his favorite film while growing up and cited it as a major influence on Zootopia. It was also one of the many inspirations for the then-emerging furry fandom. Some of the characters from the film also cameoed in the 1983 Oscar-nominated featurette short Mickey's Christmas Carol. The film was nominated for a spot on AFI's 10 Top 10 by American Film Institute in 2008 for the Animated Film list.

The song "Love" was featured in the 2009 feature film Fantastic Mr. Fox. as well as on the 2023 Amazon.com Super Bowl ad "Saving Sawyer". The song "Whistle-Stop" was sped up and used in the Hampster Dance, one of the earliest internet memes, and later used at normal speed in the Super Bowl XLVIII commercial for T-Mobile. The song "Oo De Lally" is featured in a 2015 commercial for Android which shows animals of different species playing together.

Robin Hood, Little John, Maid Marian, Prince John and Sir Hiss appear as playable characters in the video game Disney Magic Kingdoms, along with attractions based on Sherwood Forest and Nottingham. In the game, the characters are involved in new storylines that serve as a continuation of the events of the film.

Live-action adaptation 
In April 2020, it was reported that Disney is developing a live action/CG hybrid remake of Robin Hood featuring the same kind of anthropomorphic characters as in the 1973 film, with Kari Granlund writing and Carlos Lopez Estrada directing (after previously directing Walt Disney Animation Studios’ 2021 animated action-adventure Raya and the Last Dragon), while Justin Springer will produce the film. The remake will be released exclusively on Disney+.

See also 

 List of films and television series featuring Robin Hood
 Cultural depictions of John of England
 List of American films of 1973

References

Bibliography

External links 

 
 
 
 
 

1973 animated films
1973 films
1970s adventure comedy films
1970s American animated films
1970s fantasy adventure films
1970s fantasy comedy films
1970s musical comedy films
American adventure comedy films
American buddy comedy films
American fantasy comedy films
American children's animated adventure films
American children's animated comedy films
American children's animated fantasy films
American children's animated musical films
American musical comedy films
Animated buddy films
Animated films about foxes
Cultural depictions of John, King of England
Films about hypnosis
Films about outlaws
Films about princes
Films directed by Wolfgang Reitherman
Films scored by George Bruns
Films set in castles
Films set in Nottingham
Films set in the Middle Ages
Robin Hood films
Walt Disney Animation Studios films
Walt Disney Pictures animated films
1970s children's animated films
Cultural depictions of Richard I of England
Films adapted into comics
Cross-dressing in American films
1973 comedy films
1970s English-language films